Kiphire (Pron:/ˈkɪfɑɪə/) is a town and the administrative seat of the Kiphire District in the Indian state of Nagaland. It is situated at an elevation of 896 m (2,940 ft) above sea level and is located about 254 km from Kohima, the capital of Nagaland.

External links 

 
Cities and towns in Kiphire district